John Ulrich Graf (1811 in Grub – 24 September 24, 1887) was a German missionary for the Church Missionary Society (CMS) who was active in Sierra Leone from 1837–1855. He was involved in the relocation of Yoruba recaptives to their homeland where the CMS was to set up missions at Abeokuta and Ibadan.

Graf first trained at the Basel Mission before coming England. He was ordained as a deacon by James Henry Monk, the Bishop of Gloucester on 5 June 1836.  In 1837 he went  Islington to finish his training at the Church Missionary College. He then returned to Sierra Leone, where he took over Saint Thomas Church, Hastings from John Fredrick Schön, whose wife had recently died.

By 1855 Graf was suffering from ill health and returned to Britain. He died in 1887.

References

1811 births
1887 deaths
German Anglican missionaries
Anglican missionaries in Sierra Leone
German expatriates in Sierra Leone
Yoruba history